Mount Zion Baptist Church is a historic African-American Baptist church located at 413 N. Church Street in Salisbury, Rowan County, North Carolina.  The sanctuary was built in 1907, and is a red brick Gothic Revival style building. It features stained glass lancet windows and small triangular shaped windows and former towers capped by octagonal conical roofs. A brick-veneered educational/manse wing added between 1913 and 1920.

It was listed on the National Register of Historic Places in 1985.

References

African-American history of North Carolina
Baptist churches in North Carolina
Churches on the National Register of Historic Places in North Carolina
Gothic Revival church buildings in North Carolina
Churches completed in 1907
Churches in Rowan County, North Carolina
National Register of Historic Places in Rowan County, North Carolina
Churches in Salisbury, North Carolina